Starlight Children's Foundation is a nonprofit organization founded in 1982. Starlight's programs include providing hospital wear, games, and deliveries to hospitalized children. The programs are provided directly to children through Starlight's network of more than 700 children's hospitals and other community health partners throughout the world. Starlight's US operations are based in Los Angeles, California. Starlight also operates in Canada, the United Kingdom, Australia and possibly other countries, though their websites are unclear about their global operations.

Programs 
The non-profit's programs aim to deliver happiness to seriously ill kids and include specially manufactured Starlight Nintendo Gaming Stations for hospital use, Disney Princess-themed hospital wear, and Starlight Radio Flyer Hero Wagons with an IV pole attachment. Real-life superhero Captain Starlight also entertains sick and ill kids in hospitals as well.

History
Starlight Children's Foundation was founded in 1982 by filmmaker Peter Samuelson and actress Emma Samms, who was inspired by her 8-year-old brother's death from aplastic anemia. Steven Spielberg serves as the organization's chairman Emeritus. Starlight's current CEO is Adam Garone.

Starbright World

Starbright World was the first-ever private social network, started in 1995 by filmmaker and chairman Emeritus Steven Spielberg, Peter Samuelson and Norman Schwarzkopf Jr. It served to connect chronically ill teenagers with life-threatening medical conditions, and their siblings, in a safe, online community where they could chat, blog, post content, and meet others who shared similar experiences. Starbright World was taken offline on August 31, 2015.

References

External links

Children's charities based in the United States
Organizations established in 1982
Charities based in California
1982 establishments in California
Health charities in the United States
Medical and health organizations based in California